Pindaya ( Pìñṯáyá myoú) is a town in the Shan State of Burma. It is located in the west of the state in Pindaya Township in Taunggyi District. Mainly famous for its limestone caves called Pindaya Caves where thousands of Buddha images have been consecrated for worship over the centuries, it is also one of the towns that host an itinerant market every fifth day.

Etymology
According to local legend, the term Pindaya is a corruption of the word Pinguya, which translates to Taken the Spider in Burmese. The name arose from the legend that there was once a large spider which resided in the caves and it had captured a local princess. The princess was rescued when the giant spider was slain by a prince using a bow and arrow. When the spider was killed, the prince was said to have exclaimed that he had taken the spider, that is to kill it. Thus, the exclamation became the name of the region, and from it Pindaya received its name.

Attractions 

The  Pindaya Caves, a mild 45 minute walk away from the town, are the most famous attraction the town has to offer. Another lesser known attraction is the PlanBee Beekeeping Center.  Visitors can test and buy pure organically made local honey and other bee products while enjoying a cup of coffee and the gorgeous view of Pone Taloke Lake.

References

External links
Land of Harmony, Spirit of Grace: A Journey through Pindaya Debbie Jefkin-Elnekave, December 2003, PSA Journal
Flickr photos

Populated places in Shan State
Township capitals of Myanmar